Hector Arthur Gee (10 November 1909 – 1987) was an Australian professional rugby league footballer who played in the 1930s and 1940s.

Playing career

Australia
Gee played in the Ipswich Rugby League competition for the Tivoli club, gaining selection for Queensland in 1930. He then played  for Australia while at Tivoli in the 6-8 defeat by Great Britain at the Sydney Cricket Ground on Monday 6 June 1932, scored 2-tries playing alongside Tivoli teammate, Forward Les Heidke in the 15-6 victory over Great Britain at the Gabba, Brisbane on Saturday 18 June 1932, and in the 13-18 defeat by Great Britain at Sydney Cricket Ground on Saturday 16 July 1932.

England
Having moved to England to continue his playing career, he made his début for Wigan in the 26-20 victory over St. Helens Recreation at Central Park, Wigan on Saturday 15 October 1932, he scored his first try for Wigan in the 17-11 victory over Halifax at Thrum Hall, Halifax on Saturday 22 October 1932, he scored his last try for Wigan in the 17-2 victory over Oldham at Watersheddings, Oldham on Saturday 8 January 1944, and he played his last Match for Wigan in the 27-0 victory over Keighley at Lawkholme Lane, Keighley on Saturday 2 September 1944.

Gee played  in Wigan's 30-27 victory over France at Central Park, Wigan, on Saturday 10 March 1934. He then played , in Wigan's 15-3 victory over Salford in the Championship Final during the 1933–34 season at Wilderspool Stadium, Warrington on Saturday 28 April 1934.

Gee played  for Dominion XIII while at Wigan in the 5-8 defeat by France at Stade Buffalo, Paris on Sunday 26 April 1936, and for British Empire XIII while at Wigan in 15-0 victory over France at Stade Buffalo, Paris on Monday 1 November 1937.

Gee played  in Wigan's 12-21 defeat by Salford in the 1934–35 Lancashire County Cup Final during the 1934–35 season at Station Road, Swinton on Saturday 20 October 1934, and played  in the 10-7 victory over Salford in the 1938–39 Lancashire County Cup Final during the 1938–39 season at Station Road, Swinton, on Saturday 22 October 1938.

Gee played  in Wigan's 13-9 victory over Dewsbury in the Championship Final first-leg during the 1943–44 season at Central Park, Wigan on Saturday 13 May 1944 (Tommy Bradshaw played  in the second-leg).

Gee played for Batley as a World War II guest from Leeds, and was transferred permanently from Leeds to Batley on 23 April 1945, he made his début for Batley against Barrow at Mount Pleasant, Batley on Saturday 25 August 1945, and he played his last match for Batley against Liverpool Stanley at Mount Pleasant, Batley on Saturday 24 May 1947.

References

External links

1909 births
1987 deaths
Australia national rugby league team players
Australian rugby league players
Batley Bulldogs players
British Empire rugby league team players
Dominion XIII rugby league team players
Leeds Rhinos players
Place of birth missing
Queensland rugby league team players
Rugby league five-eighths
Rugby league halfbacks
Wigan Warriors players